Dujam "Duje" Krstulović (born 5 February 1953) is a former Croatian basketball player who competed for SFR Yugoslavia in the 1980 Summer Olympics.

References

1953 births
Living people
Yugoslav men's basketball players
1978 FIBA World Championship players
Croatian men's basketball players
KK Split players
Olympic basketball players of Yugoslavia
Basketball players at the 1980 Summer Olympics
Olympic gold medalists for Yugoslavia
Olympic medalists in basketball
Basketball players from Split, Croatia
Medalists at the 1980 Summer Olympics
FIBA World Championship-winning players
Power forwards (basketball)